Nicol Mac Flann was Archbishop-elect of Tuam.

Mac Flann appears to have been a kinsman of a previous Archbishop, Flann Mac Flainn (1250–56).

Mac Flann was elected Archbishop of Tuam before 20 October 1283, but never consecrated. His elected predecessor, Malachias Hibernicus, was never installed. It was not until September 1286 that Bishop of Waterford, Stephen de Fulbourn, became the new Archbishop.

The surname is now rendered McLynn or Glynn in County Galway.

See also
 Glynn (disambiguation)

References

 http://www.ucc.ie/celt/published/T100005C/
 https://archive.org/stream/fastiecclesiaehi04cottuoft#page/n17/mode/2up

Archbishops of Tuam
13th-century Roman Catholic bishops in Ireland
Christian clergy from County Galway